Amirthagateswarar Abhirami Temple (also called Abhirami temple is a Hindu temple dedicated to Shiva in his manifestation as "Destroyer of Death" and his wife Parvati as Abhirami. There is a Shrine for Vishnu as Amritha Narayanan and his consort Mahalakshmi as Amritha Valli Thayar .  It is located in Thirukkadaiyur (Thirukadavur), 21 km East of Mayiladuthurai, Tamil Nadu in India. This temple is associated with the legend of Shiva saving his young devotee, Markendeya from death, and the tale of a saint, Abirami Pattar a devotee of the presiding goddess.

The presiding deity is revered in the 7th century Tamil Saiva canonical work, the Tevaram, written by Tamil saint poets known as the nayanars and classified as Paadal Petra Sthalam. The temple complex covers 10 acres and has two gateway towers known as gopurams. The temple has numerous shrines, with those of Amirthaghateswarar and Abhirami being the most prominent. The temple has six daily rituals at various times from 5:30 a.m. to 10 p.m., and twelve yearly festivals on its calendar. The present masonry structure was built during the Chola dynasty in the 9th century, while later expansions are attributed to Thanjavur Nayaks. The temple is maintained and administered by the Dharmapuram Aadhenam.

As per Hindu legend, Shiva is believed to have destroyed eight different demons and the eight Ashta Veeratanam temples are built signifying each of his victories. The temple is counted one of the eight where Shiva is believed to have appeared as Kalasamharamurthy to save Markandeya from the death clutches of Yama. Based on the legend of Markandeya, it is believed that worshiping at this temple will give longevity to couples who have reached age sixty or eighty-one and such worship is common in the temple.

Brahmapureeswarar Temple at Thirukadaiyur Mayanam or Brahmapureeswarar Temple Thirumeiganam, Pillaiperumalnallur, another famous Padal Petra Shiva Sthalam is located nearby, easterly.

Legend

Thirukkadaiyur derives its name from the pot, called Gatam in Tamil.  Vishnu, Indra, and the other Devas needed a sublime place to consume the ambrosia that had been churned during the Samudra manthan and, therefore, brought the ambrosia pot here. Before consuming it, they forgot to worship Ganesha, who is to be worshiped before any great undertaking. Ganesha, hurt and offended at the unintentional slight by the devas, stole the pot of Amrita and hid it at Tirukkadaiyur. Ganesha created a Shiva Lingam, dedicated to his father and mother, and poured some of the Amrita over it. The Shiva Lingam at this temple is known as Amrita Ghat Eshwarar, which, translated from Sanskrit literally means "Lord that leads to immortality" ('Immortality' (Amrita) 'Step' (Ghat) 'Lord' (Eshwarar)). It is also believed that Abhirami incarnated here by the power of Vishnu.

As per popular legend, near the temple of Tirukkadaiyur, there lived a sage named Mrikandu and his wife Marudmati. They were both devotees of Shiva and worshiped him day and night for many years, asking to be graced with a child. After many years of penance, Shiva appeared to Mrikandu and Marudmati. He told them that he heard their prayers and would give them a choice: they could either have a gifted son who would live to be only sixteen, or a son of low intelligence who would live a long life. Mrikandu and Marudmati chose the former, and were blessed with Markandeya, an exemplary son, destined to die at the age of sixteen.

As Markandeya grew, so did his devotion to Shiva.  As advised by his father, Markandeya worshipped the Shiva Lingam at Tirukkadaiyur, even bringing water from the Ganges to the temple via an underground passage. On the day he was destined to die, Yama, the deity of death, appeared with his noose to tie around the soul of Markandeya and take it with him. Markandeya sought refuge in the temple and embraced the Siva Lingam. Shiva appeared and warned Yama not to touch Markandeya, as he was under his protection. Yama refused to listen and threw the noose anyway, binding Markandeya and the Lingam together. Angered by Yama's extraordinary arrogance, Shiva kicked him and held him under his foot, making Yama inactive. Markandeya was blessed by Shiva to remain sixteen years old eternally. Shiva came to be known as "Kala-samhara" (Sanskrit: "Destroyer of Time") at this temple.

Meanwhile, with Yama being rendered inactive, there were no deaths on earth, but people were still being born.  Burdened by the weight of so many people and unable to sustain their hunger, the earth-goddess, Bhumi Devi, appealed to Shiva for help. Shiva, feeling compassionate for the earth-goddess, released Yama, allowing death to occur again.  However, in order to remind Yama never to try to kill someone while they are worshiping Shiva again, the icon of Shiva in this temple is depicted with his forefinger raised in warning.

Since it is believed that Lord Siva subdued Yama in Thirukkadaiyur, the Lord is called Mrityunjaya (Sanskrit: "Conqueror of Death" or "Victorious over Death").

History
There are several inscriptions in the temple belonging to the Medieval Cholas. On the southern wall in the central shrine, there is an inscription from the 13th regnal year of Rajaraja I indicating stipulation of paddy to the temple by a merchant in return to offer of land to the temple offered. Another record in the temple indicates the record (ARE 242 of 1925) of a gift of paddy to the temple by Rajendra Chola for conducting eight-day temple festival annually. A third record on the same wall indicates record dated to 1054 AD from the reign of Rajadhiraja Chola records a gift of land by a devotee to feed 17 devotees. The fourth record (ARE 244 of 1925) in the shrine from the period of Kulothunga Chola I indicates the Mahasabha of Tirukadavur selling 1.74 velis of land that had been lying fallow for 50 years. An interesting inscription from the outer precinct from the period of Rajaraja II indicates confiscation of lands from a custodian of a temple who colluded with Vaishanvites (worshipers of Vishnu). There are several inscriptions indicating donations for performing art, drama, dance and music. The temple is maintained and administered by the Dharmapuram Adheenam.

Architecture

Though the details of the king who consecrated the temple are uncertain, it can be ascertained from inscriptions in the temple that it has been in existence since at least the tenth or eleventh century, during the reign of Raja Raja Chola I. It was during the period of Kulothunga Chola I (1075–1120) that the brick walls of the temple were replaced with stone walls and the mandapam in the front was constructed. The rajagopuram, or the front entryway of the temple, is replete with images made of mortar, depicting various legends associated with the temple.

The temple faces West and is approached through a seven-tiered raja gopuram (pyramidal temple tower). The central shrine houses the image of Amrithakadeswarar in the form of Linga. There is a separate shrine for Kalasamharamurthy, the saviour of Markendeya near the sanctum. The bronze image is sported with four arms, emanating out of a Linga. The niches in the walls around the first precinct contains images of Durga, Dakshinamurthy and Chandikesa. There are five set of stone sculptures belonging to the Chola temple. There are three temple tanks, or teerthams, known as Amrita Pushkarini, Kaala Theertham and Maarkandeya Theertham. There is a separate shrine dedicated to Abhirami. The Shakta saint Abhirami Pattar is believed to have rendered the Abhirami Anthathi in the front hall of the shrine. The temple also maintains a separate shrine for Markandeya worshipping Kalasamhara Murti. Although Thirukadaiyur is a Shaiva temple, it contains an old Vaishnava temple. The gods in this temple are Amrita Narayana (Vishnu) and his consort Amrita Valli (Lakshmi). The shrine of Abirami faces east and is located close to the entrance tower. The precinct houses the image of Abirami Pattar.

Abhirami Pattaar

At this temple, towards the beginning of the sixteenth century, there lived a staunch devotee of the goddess Abhirami named Abhirami Bhattar (Subramanyam Iyer)  . He loved the goddess so much that he saw her everywhere and in everyone, but especially in all women.  Any woman that entered the temple he would offer flowers to, worshiping her as the living embodiment of the goddess.

One day, King Saraboji visited the temple as Subramanian was meditating on the glories of Abhirami. Seeing that Subramanian did not bow before him as he entered the temple, the king became irritated. He asked one of the devotees in the temple who this man was that refused to recognize him. One priest told the king that Subramanian was mad, worshiping all women as the Divine Mother and showering them with flowers. However, another priest of the temple overheard this and corrected the man, saying that Subramanian was truly a saint and a great devotee of Mother Abhirami.

The king, confused by the two conflicting accounts of who this man was, decided to put Subramanian to the test. Therefore, he asked Subramanian whether today was a full moon day or a new moon day. At that time, Subramanian was still absorbed in meditation on the Divine Mother, seeing her shining face in his mind. Subramanian, seeing the Goddess' face and mistaking it for the moon, responded to the king saying that it was a full moon day when it was actually a new moon day. The king, deciding that Subramanian must be mad, ordered that he be burnt at dusk if the moon failed to appear. After some time, the king's army awakened Subramanian and ordered him to come with them to be executed for his madness. On returning to ordinary consciousness, Subramanian realized that he had mistaken the face of the Divine Mother for the full moon, making him say it was a full moon day when, in actuality, it was a new moon day.

Standing at the pyre, with the flames rising all around him, Subramanian realized that only the Divine Mother could save him now.  He began singing a song of one-hundred praises to Abhirami (the so-called Abhirami Antati or "Song to Abhirami"), begging her to come to his rescue. While singing the seventy-ninth verse of his song, which states that the Divine Mother is an ocean of blessing without limit whose merciful eyes grant liberation, Mother Abhirami appeared before Subramanian, his executioners, and the unbelieving king. Throwing her "thadanga", diamond nose-ring into the sky, it took the form of the full moon.

The king, having realized his mistake and immensely pleased by his devotion, released Subramanian. From that day forward, Subramanian was called Abhirami Bhattar, which translates to "priest of Abhirami", and the king became his disciple.  To this day, Abhirami Bhattar is still celebrated at Thirukadaiyur on the new moon day in the Tamil month of Tai (mid-January to mid-February).

Religious importance

Among the sixty-three Shaiva poet-saints, collectively known as the Nayanars, Kungiliya Kalaya Nayanar and Kari Nayanar both worshiped and attained liberation from the cycle of birth and death here. Kalaya Nayanar was an ardent worshiper of Shiva and lighted temple lamps & incense sticks with his meager earning. Once he had no earning and the family was facing severe poverty. Kalaya's wife gave his gold ornament to sell for daily expenditure. Kalaya sold the gold and used the money for lighting the temple lamps. As he lighted more and more lamps, his house was filled with grains. A divine voice detailed his affinity towards the presiding deity resulted in the wealth. He came to be known as Kungili Kalayanar (kungilium in Tamil means incense powder).
 
The Nayanars Appar, Sundarar and Tirugnana Sambandar have also sung of the glories of this shrine. All Siddhas visited this temple. Specially Siddhar Korakkar visited this temple and got the blessings of the goddess. As the temple is revered in Tevaram, it is classified as Paadal Petra Sthalam, one of the 276 temples that find mention in the Saiva canon. The eleven songs of Sambandar are compiled in third Thirumurai as 8th canto. The thirty one songs of Appar are compiled in the fourth Thirumrai ten each under 31st and 107th canto, while the remaining eleven in fifth Thirumrai under 11th canto. The ten songs of Sundarar are compiled in seventh Thirumurai in 28th cantor.

As per legends, Shiva is believed to have destroyed eight different demons namely Andhakasura, Gajasura, Jalandhara, Thirupuradhi, Kama, Arjunan, Dakshan and Tarakasur. There are Ashta Veeratanam temples  built signifying each of his victories in the war, and also as places where he is believed to have performed with fury. The eight temples are Tiruvadigai Veerattaaneswarar Temple at Thiruvadigai, Tirukkovilur Veerateshwarar Temple at Tirukoilur, Veerateswarar temple at Korukkai or Thirukkurukkai, Amirtagateswarar Temple at Thirukadaiyur, Vazhuvur Verateswarar Temple at Vazhuvoor, Keelaparasalur Veerateswarar Temple at Tirupariyalur, Kandeeswarar Temple at Thirukkandiyur and Tiruvirkudi Veerataneswarar Temple at Thiruvirkudi. Shiva in all these temples are described to have used bow and arrow, trident and spear.

Worship and festivals

The temple priests perform the pooja (rituals) during festivals and on a daily basis. Like other Shiva temples of Tamil Nadu, the priests belong to the Shaivaite community, a Brahmin sub-caste. The temple rituals are performed six times a day; Ushathkalam at 5:30 a.m., Kalasanthi at 8:00 a.m., Uchikalam at 10:00 a.m., Sayarakshai at 6:00 p.m., Irandamkalam at 8:00 p.m. and Ardha Jamam at 10:00 p.m. Each ritual comprises four steps: abhisheka (sacred bath), alangaram (decoration), neivethanam (food offering) and deepa aradanai (waving of lamps) for both Amritaghateswar and Abhirami Amman. The worship is held amidst music with nagaswaram (pipe instrument) and tavil (percussion instrument), religious instructions in the Vedas read by priests and prostration by worshippers in front of the temple mast.

Based on the legend of Markandeya, it is believed that worshipping at this temple will give longevity to couples who have reached age sixty or eighty-one. A service called Sashtiaptha poorthi (Tamil: "completion of sixty [years]") is celebrated in honor of a husband's sixtieth birthday and Sadhabishegam (Sanskrit: "Eighty-One") is celebrated in honor of his eighty-first birthday.  The annual Brahmotsavam is celebrated in the month of Chithirai (April–May) here.  The Shankha-abhisheka, a festival of the Divine Mother celebrated in the month of Kartikai (November–December), is also of great importance here. Other festivals celebrated at this temple in honor of the Divine Mother include Navaratri and Aadi Pooram, a festival celebrating the day that Abhirami attained her menarche.

References 
http://www.thirukkadaiyurpooja.com/thirukadaiyur.html

Shiva temples in Mayiladuthurai district
Padal Petra Stalam
Ashta Veeratta Stalam